Carbon engineering may refer to:

Greenhouse gas removal
Carbon dioxide removal
Carbon dioxide scrubber
Carbon Engineering, a Canadian company